Castilleja septentrionalis is a species of Indian paintbrush known by several different common names, including pale painted cup (in New Hampshire and Vermont), northern painted cup (in Maine), pale Indian paintbrush (in Michigan), and Labrador Indian paintbrush. The scientific name "Castilleja pallida (L.) Spreng. var. septentrionalis (Lindl.) Gray" has also been used in the past to describe this species.

According to the White Mountain National Forest botanist Chris Mattrick, "The stunning beauty of the inflorescence stands out in sharp contrast to the green and gray background of the alpine habitats in New England and elicits many complimentary remarks from the passerby."

Distribution

Its distribution extends from Labrador and Newfoundland to Alberta, at the northern edge of its range, and from Maine as far west as Utah.  In New Hampshire, it is an alpine obligate, typically found in patch communities associated with heavy late-melting snow, which provides not only moisture but also protection from weather. It is found only in northern regions or at high elevations; the species name "septentrionalis" means "northern."

New Hampshire, Vermont, and Michigan designate C. septentrionalis as "Threatened"; Maine labels it "Special Concern"; Minnesota considers it "Endangered". It is not listed as a threatened species at the federal level.

Description
C. septentrionalis is a perennial herb with small narrow leaves, growing typically in small dense colonies. Like many other Castilleja species, it gets some of its nutrients from parasitizing the roots of other plants.

Shoots are typically unbranched, becoming hairy only on their upper portions, with alternate simple leaves that are sessile (have no pedicel) The crowded flower clusters appear at the end of stems

Each flower cluster consists of tubular greenish-white flowers surrounded by cream-colored or purple-tinged bracts.

References

pilosa
Flora of the Northern United States
Flora of Maine
Flora of New Hampshire
Flora of Vermont
Flora of Michigan
Flora of Utah
Flora without expected TNC conservation status